Gregoriidae is an extinct family of early sharks from the Carboniferous period. It currently includes three described genera: Gregorius, Srianta, and Bealbonn. This family includes remains formerly ascribed to "Desmiodus," which is now considered a nomen vanum. The relationships between the included genera are not entirely clear. Fossils are known from Serpukhovian-aged formations including the Bear Gulch Limestone and Surprise Canyon Formation.

References 

Sharks
Prehistoric cartilaginous fish families